Bymount is a rural locality in the Maranoa Region, Queensland, Australia. In the  Bymount had a population of 32 people.

Geography 
The Carnarvon Highway passes north to south through the locality.

History 
Bymount State School opened in September 1927 but closed in December 1932. It reopened on 2 November 1938. On 1 March 1945, another school, Bymount East State School, opened. On 11 May 1947, Bymount State School closed leaving only Bymount East State School.

In the  Bymount had a population of 32 people.

Education 
Bymount East State School is a government primary (Prep-6) school for boys at 6441 Carnarvon Highway. In 2016, the school had an enrolment of 7 students with 1 teacher and 3 non-teaching staff (1 full-time equivalent). In 2018, the school had an enrolment of 6 students with 1 teachers and 3 non-teaching staff (1 full-time equivalent).

References 

Maranoa Region
Localities in Queensland